Astacosia ornatrix is a moth of the subfamily Arctiinae. It was described by Hervé de Toulgoët in 1958. It is found on Madagascar.

References

Moths described in 1958
Lithosiini
Moths of Madagascar
Moths of Africa